Nothoscordum bivalve is a species of flowering plant in the Amaryllidaceae known by the common names crowpoison and false garlic. It is native to the eastern United States from Texas to Florida up to Nebraska and Ohio, as well as Mexico, Peru, Uruguay, northeastern Argentina and central Chile.

Nothoscordum bivalve is a perennial herb growing from a bulb about a centimeter wide. It produces one erect stem, or occasionally two. The inflorescence is an umbel of 3 to 6 flowers, or sometimes up to 10. There are two bracts at the base of the umbel. The flower has six whitish tepals, each of which usually has a dark reddish midvein. The flower does not smell of onion. It can have a fragrant scent. The fruit is a capsule.

This is a common plant which grows in parks and on roadsides, and soils which are not too dry or too wet; it grows well in lawns. It is a favorite nectar source for small butterflies such as the falcate orangetip.

References

External links

USDA Plants Profile

Allioideae
Flora of the United States
Flora of Mexico
Flora of Peru
Flora of Argentina
Flora of Uruguay
Flora of Chile
Plants described in 1753
Taxa named by Carl Linnaeus